Made in Jaffna is a 14-song studio album curated by Toronto-based Tamil artist Shan Vincent de Paul which released on 6 September 2021. It is Shan's third studio album after Saviors (2017) and Kothu Boys (2020). The album describes about identity, perseverance, and reconciliation and learning to embrace the tenets of an outsider juggling multiple identities in a foreign land.

Background 
In an interview with the New York-based Flaunt magazine, Paul had stated:Just my journey as an artist up to this point. It really is reflective of my community, of the Tamil community, and our experience of juggling two cultures. The story can be related to a lot of people that have left their homeland and had to juggle two cultures. It’s my personal story of growing up in the West and being influenced by hip hop, my family’s story of leaving Sri Lanka and dealing with that. It’s my most autobiographical piece to date, 4 years in the making. I know it’s cliché to say it’s my most personal work, but it really is. The most vulnerable I’ve been on record, I'm super excited to share it.According to Paul, he called the album his "most personal one" in an interview with Lifestyle Asia. The album is about telling the experiences of he and his family and community coming from Jaffna to Toronto due to the Sri Lankan Civil War and it also comments about the Tamil Eelam experience. He further added that "Tamilians from Sri Lanka are often synonymous with suffering. Here, an artistic renaissance is booming, underlining the redemption and resilience of South Asian communities. Via this album, I want to show others what we are capable of, and we are not about suffering any longer."

Release 
When he was announced being a part of Maajja, an independent platform launched by A. R. Rahman, he created two independent songs for the project management, one of them being the independent single "Amnesia" and this studio album. Paul decided to release 12 singles out of the 14-track album which was scheduled for release on 11 August 2021, but was launched on 6 September 2021. One of his earlier released singles "One Hundred Thousand Flowers" and "Heaven" will also be featured in the album. The first single being titled "Savage" was unveiled on 28 May 2021, with the music video being released on the same day and received overwhelmingly positive response for its picturization and composition. The second single "Neeye Oli" co-written by Arivu and composed by Santhosh Narayanan was unveiled on 30 June 2021. The track was Narayanan's second collaboration with the platform and also his second independent single after "Enjoy Enjaami", being used as a theme song for the Pa. Ranjith-directed film Sarpatta Parambarai (2021). The tracks – "Hard Times", "Uyire" and "After Life" – were launched as singles on 9, 23 July and 13 August. Five days, before the album launch, on 1 September 2021, the title track "Made in Jaffna" was released and received positive response. According to Paul, the track is "a scorching tale of personal growth and resilience".

Track listing

Personnel 
 Shan Vincent de Paul - Vocalist (all tracks), composer (all tracks), album producer (all tracks), lyricist (Track 1,2,3), audio mixing (Track 1,3,4)
 Santhosh Narayanan - Composer (Track 2), album producer (Track 2), playback singer (Track 2), sound engineer (Future Tense Studios, Chennai) [Track 2]
 Navz-47 - Playback singer (Track 2,4)
 Arivu - Lyricist (Track 2)
 Yanchan Rajmohan - Lyricist (Track 2)
 Rob Benvegnu - Lyricist (Track 2,3)
 Naveeni Athanosious - Lyricist (Track 3)
 RK Sundar - Sound engineer (Future Tense Studios, Chennai) [Track 2]
 Sai Shravanam - Sound engineer (Resound India, Chennai) [Track 2], audio mixing (Track 2), mastering (Track 2)
 Gurjith Singh - Mastering (Track 1,3,4)
 Meenakshi Santhosh - Music co-ordinator (Track 2)

Charts

References 

2021 albums